Chad Ingels is an American farmer, business owner, and politician serving as a member of the Iowa House of Representatives from the 64th district. Elected in November 2020, he assumed office on January 11, 2021.

Education 
Ingels earned a Bachelor of Science in horticulture and Master of Science in professional agriculture from Iowa State University.

Career 
Since 1991, Ingels has owned and operated a farm. He also worked as a watershed specialist for Iowa State University Extension from 1999 to 2016. He also founded ClearWater Ag Strategies, a management firms that advises farmers on management strategies. Ingels was elected to the Iowa House of Representatives in November 2020 and assumed office on January 11, 2021. Ingels also serves as vice chair of the House Agriculture Committee.

Personal life 
Ingels and his wife Tammy have three children, two with Down syndrome.

References 

Living people
Iowa State University alumni
Republican Party members of the Iowa House of Representatives
Year of birth missing (living people)